Alica Stuhlemmer (born 24 August 1999 Kiel) is a German sailor who lives in Altenholz. She represented Germany, along with partner Paul Kohlhoff, in the Nacra 17 class at the 2020 Summer Olympics in Tokyo, winning the bronze medal. At 22 years old Alica was the youngest sailor to win a medal throughout all sailing disciplines in Tokyo.

In 2020 she and her partner were in tenth place in the European championship and eleventh in the World Championship.

Career 
She competed at the 2019 Hempel World Cup, 2019 World Championship, and 2020 World Championship.

References

External links 
 
 
 
 

1999 births
Living people
Sportspeople from Kiel
German female sailors (sport)
Olympic bronze medalists for Germany
Olympic medalists in sailing
Olympic sailors of Germany
Sailors at the 2020 Summer Olympics – Nacra 17
Medalists at the 2020 Summer Olympics
Nacra 17 class sailors